Rylah is a surname. Notable people with the surname include:

 Arthur Rylah (1909–1974), Australian politician 
 Joan Rylah (born 1955), Australian politician